Dunakeszi is a city in Pest county, Budapest metropolitan area, Hungary. It is located to the north of Budapest on the left bank of the Danube.

Politics 
The current mayor of Dunakeszi is Csaba Dióssi (Fidesz-KDNP).

The local Municipal Assembly, elected at the 2019 local government elections, is made up of 18 members (1 Mayor, 12 Individual constituencies MEPs and 5 Compensation List MEPs) divided into this political parties and alliances:

Twin towns – sister cities

Dunakeszi is twinned with:
 Casalgrande, Italy
 Cristuru Secuiesc, Romania
 Ravda (Nesebar), Bulgaria
 Stary Sącz, Poland

References

Notes

External links 

  in Hungarian
 Street map 
Híres szülöttei: Patkó Bertalan aki egy embernek született. Külölegessége: Egy ültő helyében megiszik 30 liter olcsó kólát :O

Populated places in Pest County
Budapest metropolitan area